Crash Drive is a 1959 British racing car film starring Dermot Walsh, which was produced by the Danziger Brothers.

Rolf Harris has a small role.

Plot
Paul Dixon is an international racing driver severely depressed after being paralysed from the waist down in a crash. He seems to have lost everything, including his will to live. His estranged wife Ann returns to him in the wake of the accident and attempts to cure him of his despair.

Cast
Dermot Walsh as Paul Dixon
Wendy Williams as Ann Dixon
Ian Fleming as Dr. Marshall
Anton Rodgers as Tomson
Grace Arnold as Mrs. Dixon
Ann Sears as Nurse Phillips
George Roderick as Manotti
Garard Green as Forbes
Geoffrey Hibbert as Henry
Russell Cardon as Boy pushing wheelchair

Critical reception
Sky Movies wrote, "this very minor, modest and mostly mediocre British melodrama - partly written by The Avengers producer Brian Clemens - has a hard job getting into gear."

References

External links

1959 films
British auto racing films
British drama films
Films shot at New Elstree Studios
1950s English-language films
1950s British films